Trimper Rides Of Ocean City is a historic amusement park located near the inlet at South First Street and the boardwalk in Ocean City, Maryland, United States. It was founded in 1893 as The Windsor Resort. It is located at the south end of the boardwalk and consists of three outdoor lots as well as an indoor section.

History
Daniel B. Trimper and his wife, Margaret, arrived in Ocean City in 1890. By 1893, they were owners of boardwalk property between South Division and South First Streets, including two hotels: The Eastern Shore and the Sea Bright.

Rebuilding the Sea Bright in 1900 following a severe storm, the Trimpers modeled the new structure after Great Britain's Windsor Castle. The two hotels, together with a theater and an amusement park, became known as Windsor Resort.

In 1912 Daniel Trimper purchased a massive carousel from the Herschell-Spillman Company in North Tonawanda, NY. It was 50 feet in diameter, with the only other carousel made by the firm at that time having been sent to Coney Island, and that one was later destroyed by fire. 

The carousel's 45 animals, three chariots, and one rocking chair were driven by a steam engine, with rides originally costing a nickel. It is now classified as one of the oldest still operating carousels in the nation. The carousel was declared a historic landmark in 2007.

In the 1950s, the Trimper family added outdoor rides. The pace of expansion has increased since the mid-1960s, with a new ride being added nearly every year. 

Trimper's son, Daniel, Jr., managed Windsor Resort Corporation after his father's death and served as mayor of Ocean City for 16 years. In 1964, Granville Trimper teamed up with Bill Tracy to create the Haunted House. In 1965, WWII veteran, Daniel Trimper III, was handed leadership of the park and nearly doubled its size with the purchase of the land and attractions of Melvin Amusements. Five years later, John and Maria Bilious were hired to restore the cherished Herschell-Spillman Carousel to its formal glory. 

Dan Trimper III retired in 1981, passing the reins to his cousin Granville Trimper. The most popular ride in the outdoor park was bought in 1985: the triple loop boomerang "Tidal Wave" roller coaster. 

In 2020 and 2021, Trimper Rides held a Weekly Farmers Market during the season on Fridays from 9 am-12 pm. As of 2022, they have discontinued the Farmer's Market.

In 2021, Trimper Rides hosted a Winter Carnival with local vendors, discounted select rides, and games. Also in 2021, Trimper's Rides owned an arcade on the boardwalk, Boardwalk Games, which is now permanently closed.

Beginning In 2021, Trimper Rides began construction on an outdoor food hall. Trimper Rides previously owned or leased space to The Red Apple, Jessica’s Fudge House, Chick-Fil-A, Nana’s Hot Chicken, Smoked BBQ, On The Boards, and Sticky Fingers.

In 2022 the park opened Trimper Treats, Trimper Sweets, and Trimper Carousel Corner.

Rides

The Indoor Area contains most of the rides for younger kids. It plays host to a collection of vintage amusement park memorabilia and paraphernalia, ranging from antique ticket booths, to operating antique rides. The main attractions inside this part of the building are a large collection of operating vintage William F. Mangels kiddie rides, a circa 1912 Herschell-Spillman Carousel, a bumper car ride, and a shooting gallery.

The three outdoor areas are where most of the major rides are located.

Some of the outdoor rides for the 2023 season are:
 Balloons
 Endeavor
 Fun Slide
 Himalaya
 Rock N Roll
 Spinning Coaster
 Tea Cups
 Tilt A Whirl

Trimper’s also has 2 attractions accessible from the outside:
 Mirror Maze
 "Pirate's Cove", built 1971, a Bill Tracy designed walk-through fun house; one of only two left in the world

Former rides
 Area 51 (2021-2022)
 Aladdin’s Lamp (Retired, 2018)
 Crazy Cabs (2020)
 Super Shot (2020)
 Sling Shot (2007)
 Freak Out (Retired 2019)
 Fun Slide (2020) A new one currently operates at the park.
 Hangten (2020)
 Inverter 
 Kid's Swings (2022)
 Magic Maze (2022)
 Magnum (2021-2022)
 OC Big Wheel (2020-2022)
 Rockstar (Retired 2019)
 Rock-O-Plane 
 Rockin Tug 
 Round Up (2020)
 Scrambler (Retired 2019)
 Techno Power (2021-2022)
 Tilt-A-Whirl (Retired 2019) A new one currently operates in the park.
 Toboggan (Retired 2009)
 Wacky Worm (Retired 2019)
 Yo-Yo (2022)
 Wild Mouse 
 Zipper (Retired 2019)

Arcades
Trimper Rides owns Marty’s Playland, which is an arcade on The Ocean City Boardwalk. Marty’s Playland is known to be a popular arcade featuring Skee Ball, Claw Machines, and more.

Events
During the 2020 Season, Trimper Rides added new events to help bring people into the park. Some of these included karaoke nights, DJ nights, car shows, and bike shows.

During Halloween, Trimper Rides had a children’s hay maze, hay rides, face paintings and costume contests.

Further reading

References

Amusement parks in Maryland
Buildings and structures in Worcester County, Maryland
1893 establishments in Maryland
Tourist attractions in Worcester County, Maryland
Ocean City, Maryland